Frank Tossas (23 August 1934 – 4 October 2008) was a Puerto Rican sports shooter. He competed in the 50 metre running target event at the 1972 Summer Olympics.

References

External links
 

1934 births
2008 deaths
Puerto Rican male sport shooters
Olympic shooters of Puerto Rico
Shooters at the 1972 Summer Olympics
Sportspeople from New York City